When You Trap a Tiger is a 2020 children's book by Tae Keller. The novel tells the story of a biracial girl, Lily, who learns about her heritage when her family moves in with Lily's Korean grandmother. The book was well received and won the 2021 Newbery Medal as well as the 2021  Asian Pacific American Literature Award.

References 

2020 children's books
American children's novels
Newbery Medal–winning works
Books about tigers